Ashraf Shad is a Pakistani / Australian writer, poet and journalist. Ashraf was born in Moradabad, India, and migrated first to Pakistan after the Partition of India, and then to Australia in 1989. He has also lived in the United States, Hungary, UAE, Bahrain, Brunei, and Kuwait.

Publications
 Problems of Reporting the Developing World: A case study of New York Time’s reporting on China (1992).
 Nisab, poetry collection (1996).
 Bewatan, a novel that won an award for the best novel in Pakistan (1997).
 Wazir-e-Azam, (The Prime Minister), political fiction (1999).
 Bewatan, a Hindi translation published (2001) Raj Kamal Publications, Delhi 
 Shora-e-Australia (Urdu Poets of Australia), poetry compilation (2001).
 Aa Merey Qareeb Aa (Come close to me), poetry collection, (2003).
 Sadre Mohtaram, (The President) (2004).
 Peeli Lakeer (The yellow line), short story collection (2011). 
 Ahmed Faraz Baqalam Khud, critical evaluation (2013) Dost Publications Islamabad
 Syasstein Kya Kya, interviews (2013) Dost Publications
 Akhbare Ishq, poetry collection (2013) Pakistani Adab Publications, Karachi
 Judge Saheb, novel (2017) Dost Publications Islamabad
 B A Rustam TV Anchor, novel (2018), Dost Publications
 Iskandar Mirza - memoirs, translation (2019) Varsa Publications Karachi
 Ashraf Shad - Fun Aur Shakhsiat by G N Qureshi, reviews (2013) Pakistani Adab Publications Karachi
 The Critical evaluation of Ashraf Shad’s literary work, research thesis by Amna Chaudhry (2017) Pakistani Adab, Karachi

References

External links 
 A Brief Report about the Ashraf Shad's Recent Visit of Australia
 Legendary poet Faiz Ahmed Faiz’s Birth Centennial Celebration in Sydney
 Ashraf Shad shifted from UAE to Brunei but coming on short visit to Sydney
 KARACHI: Literary prose, poetry evaluated
 Famous Poet Ashraf Shad is in Australia Again
 Ashraf Shad is in Australia again
 Famous Writer and Broadcaster Mr.Rehan Alvi hosted a Reception at his residence Greenacre Sydney

Pakistani emigrants to Australia
Pakistani novelists
Pakistani poets
Pakistani male journalists
Pakistani expatriates in Bahrain
Pakistani expatriates in Brunei
Pakistani expatriates in Kuwait
University of New South Wales alumni
Urdu-language novelists
Urdu-language poets from Pakistan
Australian writers of Pakistani descent
1946 births
Living people
Journalists from Karachi
Writers from Karachi
Muhajir people